Deirdre M. Daly (born June 17, 1959) is an American attorney who served as the United States Attorney for the District of Connecticut from 2013 to 2017.

Early life
Daly was born in a nursing home in Dublin, Ireland. Daly is the daughter of Margaret Noble Wallace and Michael J. Daly, awarded the Medal of Honor for his service in World War II. Her uncle, T.F. Gilroy Daly, had been a federal judge. Her great-great-grandfather, Thomas Francis Gilroy, served as Mayor of New York City in 1893-1894.  

Deirdre Daly graduated from Dartmouth College and Georgetown University Law Center. In college, she studied in Ireland. She served as a law clerk for federal Judge Lloyd Francis MacMahon in the United States District Court for the Southern District of New York.

Career

From 1985 to 1997, Daly was an assistant U.S. attorney in the Southern District of New York. Daly was next a partner at Daly & Pavlis LLC. From July 2010, she served as the first assistant U.S. attorney in Connecticut.  

She started serving as the acting and interim U.S. attorney for Connecticut in May 2013. President Barack Obama nominated Daly to serve as U.S. attorney for Connecticut in March 2014. The U.S. Senate confirmed her nomination in May 2014. 

Daly submitted her resignation when it was requested on March 10, 2017, but the resignation was declined so that she could continue serving in office until October 2017 and thereby complete 20 years of service with the Justice Department. She was, along with Richard S. Hartunian, one of two U.S. Attorneys granted this extension. She officially resigned at midnight on October 27, 2017.

In June 2018, Daly joined the private law firm Finn Dixon & Herling.

Personal life
Daly married Alfred Pavlis. They have three children.

She served as Grand Marshal of the 2018 St. Patrick’s Day Parade in Norwalk, Connecticut.

See also
 2017 dismissal of U.S. attorneys

References

1959 births
Living people
United States Attorneys for the District of Connecticut
Connecticut Democrats
Dartmouth College alumni
Georgetown University Law Center alumni
Irish emigrants to the United States
21st-century American women lawyers
21st-century American lawyers